In Greek mythology, the name Guneus (Ancient Greek: Γουνεὐς derived from gounos "fruitful land") may refer to:
Guneus, a man from Pheneus and father of Laonome, wife of Alcaeus. Through his daughter, he was the grandfather of Amphitryon, Anaxo and Perimede.
Guneus, leader of the Aenianes and Perrhaebians during the Trojan War. According to Homer, "Guneus brought two and twenty ships from Cyphus, and he was followed by the Enienes and the valiant Peraebi, who dwelt about wintry Dodona." Guneus survived the war, and went to Libya where he settled near the Cinyps River. Guneus was an obscure character, though his tribal followers (Aenienians and Perrhaebians) are usually placed in northwestern Greece. Homer does not record his pedigree, but elsewhere his parents were said to be Ocytus and Aurophyte, otherwise unknown. Yet another source gives his mother's name as either Tauropoleia or Hippodameia.

Notes

References 

 Apollodorus, The Library with an English Translation by Sir James George Frazer, F.B.A., F.R.S. in 2 Volumes, Cambridge, MA, Harvard University Press; London, William Heinemann Ltd. 1921. Online version at the Perseus Digital Library. Greek text available from the same website.
Euripides, The Plays of Euripides, translated by E. P. Coleridge. Volume II. London. George Bell and Sons. 1891. Online version at the Perseus Digital Library.
 Euripides, Euripidis Fabulae. vol. 3. Gilbert Murray. Oxford. Clarendon Press, Oxford. 1913. Greek text available at the Perseus Digital Library.
 Gaius Julius Hyginus, Fabulae from The Myths of Hyginus translated and edited by Mary Grant. University of Kansas Publications in Humanistic Studies. Online version at the Topos Text Project.
 Homer, The Iliad with an English Translation by A.T. Murray, Ph.D. in two volumes. Cambridge, MA., Harvard University Press; London, William Heinemann, Ltd. 1924. Online version at the Perseus Digital Library.
 Homer, Homeri Opera in five volumes. Oxford, Oxford University Press. 1920. Greek text available at the Perseus Digital Library.
 Pausanias, Description of Greece with an English Translation by W.H.S. Jones, Litt.D., and H.A. Ormerod, M.A., in 4 Volumes. Cambridge, MA, Harvard University Press; London, William Heinemann Ltd. 1918. Online version at the Perseus Digital Library
 Pausanias, Graeciae Descriptio. 3 vols. Leipzig, Teubner. 1903.  Greek text available at the Perseus Digital Library.
 Tzetzes, John, Allegories of the Iliad translated by Goldwyn, Adam J. and Kokkini, Dimitra. Dumbarton Oaks Medieval Library, Harvard University Press, 2015. 

Achaean Leaders
Thessalians in the Trojan War
Characters in Greek mythology